Tripura Government Museum or the Tripura State Museum, is a multicultural museum with emphasis on art and crafts of the state of Tripura; established on 22 June 1970  and shifted to the Ujjayanta Palace on 25 September 2013 with a official inauguration held by Hamid Ansari, former Vice president of India. It is North-east India's largest museum with a "National perspective while remaining focused on Tripura and northeast India".

The Ujjayanta Palace ( Nuyungma in Tripuri language ), has been hosting the state museum since 2013, situated in Agartala, the capital city of Tripura. The museum houses a rare and exclusive collection of archaeological items; sculptures, Terracotta, Bronze Images, Coins of the Tripuri kingdom, paintings and other historical items which are excavated from the other historical places of Tripura.

Features
The museum had four exclusive halls when it was located in the center of the Agartala city. It was shifted to the new premises in September 2013 to the heritage palace where there are now 22 display galleries. The exhibits in the museum are of archaeological antiquities, historical Indian sculptures, paintings and tribal culture. The museum has 1406 collections on display which include 79 stone sculptures, 141 terracotta plaques, 774 coins of gold, silver and copper, 10 copper plate inscriptions, 9 stone inscriptions, 39 images of bronze, 102 textile items, 58 Oil paintings, 63 sketches and drawings, and 197 ornaments. The sculpture collections are mostly from Udaipur, Pilak, Jolaibari, and other locations in Tripura. The new museum also showcases the customs and practices of different social units of Northeast India. The objective of the museum is also to make it a "centre for active research and cultural activities".

The most distinctive exhibits are from Pilak, which consist of sculptures of different cultures of Hinduism and Buddhism from the period of 9th to 13th centuries. The well crafted and molded bronze sculptures are of Mukhalinga, Avalokitesvara, Tara, and Vishnu. The terracotta exhibits are from the Pilak and Amarpur sites, and also from Bengal school; represents folk arts of Pilak and subjects related to mythology, flowers and animals, etc.

History 
The museum was given retrofitting to prevent possible earthquake damage, and the museum was inaugurated by the Vice-President of India Mohammad Hamid Ansari on 25 September 2013.

Early in the museum's history, controversy erupted, over the state government's proposed move to change the name of Ujjayanta Palace to Tripura State Museum.

References

Museums in Tripura
1970 establishments in Tripura
Museums established in 1970
State museums in India
Buildings and structures in Agartala